Barutin is a village in southwestern Bulgaria. It is located in the municipality of Dospat, Smolyan Province.

Geography 

The village of Barutin is located in the Western Rhodope Mountains. It is situated in the Chech region.

History 

From the middle of the 17th to the beginning of the 19th century the majority of the inhabitants of the village had Yörüks origins. They abandoned the village in the beginning of the 19th century and in the middle of the 19th century the majority of the inhabitants were Pomaks. During the April Uprising Ahmed aga Barutinliata led a campaign against Batak from this village.

Religion 

The most population is Muslim. Most inhabitants of the village are Pomaks.

Sights 

 Basilica from the 5–6th century.
 Thracian settlement in the Dolna Bartina region.

Notes 

Villages in Smolyan Province
Chech